Lori Alan (born July 18, 1966) is an American actress. She has played a long-running role as Pearl Krabs on the animated television series SpongeBob SquarePants. She also voiced Diane Simmons on Family Guy, the Invisible Woman on Fantastic Four, and The Boss in the Metal Gear video game series.

Personal life
Alan was born on July 18, 1966, in Potomac, Maryland. She had a mixed-faith family: her mother is a Southern Baptist and her father is Jewish. Both of her parents were performers and supported her choice to be an actress. Alan lives in Los Angeles.

She started acting at age five, making her television debut in a Shakey's Pizza commercial. Her stage debut was as Annie's youngest sister in a local community theater production of Annie Get Your Gun. A longtime member of New York's Gotham City Improv (Groundlings East), she went on to Emerson College and graduated with honors from Tisch School of the Arts.

Alan is active in animal rescue and welfare causes. She has spoken out against animal cruelty and has campaigned for the anti-dog meat charity World Protection for Dogs and Cats in the Meat Trade. She is also on the board of Pickle Pants Rescue, an animal rescue organization in Los Angeles.

Career
Alan has done vocal work for over three decades. Her process of getting to the authentic personality of the character she is providing the voice for is to improvise and trust her own choices, something she learned at her first voice acting job.

Alan voices Pearl the Whale on SpongeBob SquarePants, Sue Richards (the Invisible Woman) on Marvel Comics' The Fantastic Four, newsreader-turned-murderer Diane Simmons on Family Guy, and The Boss in the Metal Gear series. Lori has done voices in feature films: Monsters University, Toy Story 3, Despicable Me 2, WALL·E, Inside Out, and each movie in the SpongeBob SquarePants film series. She has also voiced roles for Henry Hugglemonster, Cow and Chicken, Animaniacs, and Futurama. Her rendition of The Boss was rated as one of the top 25 "Greatest Acting Performances in Video Games" by Complex.

In 2005, she joined Warren Beatty, Rob Reiner, Kurtwood Smith and Jason George to help voice commercials against proposals made by California's Governor Arnold Schwarzenegger.

In 2014, she won a Voice Arts Award (VAA) for outstanding body of work and outstanding national television commercial.

Alan's on-camera roles include Desperate Housewives, Ray Donovan, Comedy Central's Workaholics, Bones, Southland, CSI, 90210, Law & Order: LA, Law & Order and many more. On stage credits include The Pee-wee Herman Show, solo show Lori Alan: The Musical, Queen Celia in the hit musical Sneaux!, and the award-winning musical Reefer Madness. Her 1999 performance in Reefer Madness as a "Reefer Madam" was praised by the Los Angeles Times.

She revisited her role in the Reefer Madness tenth Anniversary Cast in 2015. Her vocals on the song "The Stuff" was considered both sultry and comical by Broadway World.

Filmography

Film

Television

Web

Video games

References

External links

1966 births
Living people
Actresses from Los Angeles
Actresses from Maryland
American child actresses
American film actresses
American people of Jewish descent
American television actresses
American voice actresses
Emerson College alumni
People from Potomac, Maryland
Tisch School of the Arts alumni
20th-century American actresses
21st-century American actresses